{{safesubst:#invoke:RfD||2=Pendar|month = February
|day = 18
|year = 2023
|time = 21:12
|timestamp = 20230218211219

|content=
REDIRECT Zoroastrianism

}}